Hendrik Willem Lenstra Jr. (born 16 April 1949, Zaandam) is a Dutch mathematician.

Biography
Lenstra received his doctorate from the University of Amsterdam in 1977 and became a professor there in 1978.  In 1987, he was appointed to the faculty of the University of California, Berkeley; starting in 1998, he divided his time between Berkeley and the University of Leiden, until 2003, when he retired from Berkeley to take a full-time position at Leiden.

Three of his brothers, Arjen Lenstra, Andries Lenstra, and Jan Karel Lenstra, are also mathematicians. Jan Karel Lenstra is the former director of the Netherlands Centrum Wiskunde & Informatica (CWI). Hendrik Lenstra was the Chairman of the Program Committee of the International Congress of Mathematicians in 2010.

Scientific contributions 
Lenstra has worked principally in computational number theory. He is well known for:

 Co-discovering of the Lenstra–Lenstra–Lovász lattice basis reduction algorithm (in 1982);
 Developing an polynomial-time algorithm for solving a feasibility Integer programming problem when the number of variables is fixed (in 1983);
 Discovering the elliptic curve factorization method (in 1987);
 Computing all solutions to the inverse Fermat equation (in 1992); 
 The Cohen–Lenstra heuristics - a set of precise conjectures about the structure of class groups of quadratic fields.

Awards and honors
In 1984, Lenstra became member of the Royal Netherlands Academy of Arts and Sciences. He won the Fulkerson Prize in 1985 for his research using the geometry of numbers to solve integer programs with few variables in time polynomial in the number of constraints. He was awarded the Spinoza Prize in 1998, and on 24 April 2009 he was made a Knight of the Order of the Netherlands Lion. In 2009, he was awarded a Gauss Lecture by the German Mathematical Society. In 2012, he became a fellow of the American Mathematical Society.

Publications
 Euclidean Number Fields. Parts 1-3, Mathematical Intelligencer 1980
 with A. K. Lenstra: Algorithms in Number Theory. pp. 673–716, In Jan van Leeuwen (ed.): Handbook of Theoretical Computer Science, Vol. A: Algorithms and Complexity. Elsevier and MIT Press 1990, .
 Algorithms in Algebraic Number Theory. Bulletin of the AMS, vol. 26, 1992, pp. 211–244.
 Primality testing algorithms. Séminaire Bourbaki 1981.
 with Stevenhagen: Artin reciprocity and Mersenne Primes. Nieuw Archief for Wiskunde 2000.
 with Stevenhagen: Chebotarev and his density theorem. Mathematical Intelligencer 1992 (Online at Lenstra's Homepage).
 Profinite Fibonacci Numbers, December 2005, PDF

See also
 Print Gallery (M. C. Escher)

References

External links
 
 , Homepage at the Leiden Mathematisch Instituut

1949 births
Living people
20th-century Dutch mathematicians
21st-century Dutch mathematicians
Members of the Royal Netherlands Academy of Arts and Sciences
Number theorists
Spinoza Prize winners
University of Amsterdam alumni
Academic staff of the University of Amsterdam
Academic staff of Leiden University
University of California, Berkeley College of Letters and Science faculty
Fellows of the American Mathematical Society
Dutch expatriates in the United States
People from Zaanstad